Koratty railway station (station code: KRAN), which also known as 'Koratti Angadi' falls between Divine Nagar railway station and Karukutty railway station in the busy Shoranur–Cochin Harbour section in Thrissur district.Koratty railway station is an "HG-1" railway station that comes under the Thiruvananthapuram division of Southern Railways. All passenger trains stop here.

Trains stoppage in Koratty

References

Railway stations in Thrissur district
Thiruvananthapuram railway division